Adrianus Andreas "Adri" van Tiggelen (born 16 June 1957) is a retired Dutch footballer who played as a left back.

His career in football was intimately connected to Sparta Rotterdam, in which he began as a professional footballer, going on to manage the side in several categories and capacities, but he also played with success in Belgium for Anderlecht.

Van Tiggelen appeared nearly 60 times for the Netherlands, representing the nation at the 1990 World Cup and two European Championships, being a starter in the team that won Euro 1988.

Club career
Born in Oud-Beijerland, South Holland, van Tiggelen – nicknamed "De Spijker" (nail) – started his professional career with Sparta Rotterdam, making his Eredivisie debut on 30 August 1978, in a 1–0 home in against neighbours Feyenoord. During his five-year spell at the club, he was an undisputed starter, also finding the net every season (for a total of 13 league goals).

In 1983, van Tiggelen signed with fellow league side FC Groningen and remained there for three years, managing to again maintain top level status in every season. Afterwards, he had his first abroad experience, as he joined R.S.C. Anderlecht in neighbouring Belgium, where he also appeared regularly (as first-choice).

Aged 34, van Tiggelen returned to his own country, moving to PSV Eindhoven. The veteran marker still managed to collect nearly 100 official appearances, playing 26 games as the side won the 1991–92 national championship. He saw out his career at 38, after one season – and again in the top division – with Dordrecht'90; his last game ended 5–1, at home against FC Volendam.

Van Tiggelen then returned to his first club, mainly serving as assistant manager and youth trainer. In 2005, he had his first head coach experience, and finished the season in the second position, helping Sparta return to the first division.

The second spell as head manager – still with Sparta – occurred in late 2007, following the dismissal of Gert Aandewiel. Subsequently, van Tiggelen was part of Foeke Booy's coaching staff.

International career
Van Tiggelen earned 56 caps for the Netherlands national football team, going scoreless in the process. His debut came at age 26, as he appeared in a friendly with Belgium on 21 September 1983 (1–1).

From 1986 onwards, van Tiggelen was an automatic first-choice in the national team's setup: he played in every match and minute at UEFA Euro 1988, which the Netherlands won, and also represented the nation at the 1990 FIFA World Cup and Euro 1992, retiring from international play following the side's elimination against eventual winners Denmark in the latter competition; he was aged 35, and formed in previous years an efficient fullback partnership with Berry van Aerle (also his club mate from 1991 to 1994).

Honours

Club
PSV
Dutch League: 1991–92
Dutch Supercup: 1992; Runner-up 1991

Anderlecht
Belgian League: 1986–87, 1990–91
Belgian Cup: 1987–88, 1988–89
Belgian Supercup: 1986, 1987; Runner-up 1988, 1989

International
Netherlands
UEFA European Championship: 1988

References

External links
Beijen profile 
Stats at Voetbal International 

1957 births
Living people
People from Oud-Beijerland
Dutch footballers
Association football defenders
Eredivisie players
FC Groningen players
Sparta Rotterdam players
PSV Eindhoven players
FC Dordrecht players
Belgian Pro League players
R.S.C. Anderlecht players
Netherlands international footballers
UEFA Euro 1988 players
1990 FIFA World Cup players
UEFA Euro 1992 players
UEFA European Championship-winning players
Dutch expatriate footballers
Expatriate footballers in Belgium
Dutch football managers
Footballers from South Holland